Al Jazeera English (AJE; , , literally "The Peninsula", referring to the Qatar Peninsula) is an international 24-hour English-language news channel owned by the Al Jazeera Media Network, which is owned by the monarchy government of Qatar. It is the first English-language news channel to be headquartered in the Middle East. Instead of being run centrally, news management rotates between broadcasting centres in Doha and London.

History
The channel was launched on 15 November 2006, at 12:00 PM GMT. It had aimed to begin broadcasting in June 2006 but had to postpone its launch because its HDTV technology was not yet ready. The channel was due to be called Al Jazeera International, but the name was changed nine months before the launch because one of the channel's backers argued that the original Arabic-language channel already had an international scope.

The channel was anticipated to reach around 40 million households, but it far exceeded that launch target, reaching 80 million homes. By 2009, the service could be viewed in every major European market and was available to 130 million homes in over 100 countries via cable and satellite, according to a spokeswoman for the network in Washington.

The channel, however, has poor penetration in the American market, where it has been carried by only one satellite service and a small number of cable networks. Al Jazeera English later began a campaign to enter the North American market, including a dedicated website. It became available to some cable subscribers in New York in August 2011, having previously been available as an option for some viewers in Washington, D.C., Ohio and Los Angeles. The channel primarily reaches the United States via its live online streaming. It is readily available on most major Canadian television providers including Rogers and Bell Satellite TV after the Canadian Radio-television and Telecommunications Commission approved the channel for distribution in Canada on 26 November 2009.

Al Jazeera English and Iran's state-run Press TV were the only international English-language television broadcasters with journalists reporting from inside both Gaza and Israel during the 2008–2009 Israel-Gaza conflict. Foreign press access to Gaza has been limited via either Egypt or Israel. However, Al Jazeera's reporters Ayman Mohyeldin and Sherine Tadros were already inside Gaza when the conflict began and the network's coverage was often compared to CNN's initial coverage from inside Baghdad in the early days of the 1991 Gulf War.

The channel may also be viewed online. It recommends online viewing at its own website or at its channel on YouTube. Al Jazeera English HD launched in the United Kingdom on Freeview on 26 November 2013, and began streaming in HD on YouTube in 2015.

On 1 January 2020, Al Jazeera English debuted a new major graphics package for the first time since the channel launched to coincide with remodeled main Doha studio, the last main studio of the channel's three in Doha, London, and Washington D.C. to receive an upgrade since the channel's launch in 2006.

Al Jazeera America

On 3 January 2013, Al Jazeera Media Network announced that it had purchased Current TV in the United States and would be launching an American news channel. 60% of the channel's programming would be produced in America while 40% would be from Al Jazeera English. That was later changed at the request of pay-television providers to almost 100% American programing. Regardless, Al Jazeera America maintained a close working relationship with Al Jazeera English. The channel aired Newshour in the morning and midday hours and cut to live Al Jazeera English coverage of large breaking international news stories outside of that. Al Jazeera English programmes Witness, Earthrise, The Listening Post, Talk To Al Jazeera, Al Jazeera Correspondent and 101 East along with Al Jazeera Investigates regularly aired on Al Jazeera America.

On 13 January 2016, Al Jazeera America announced that the network would be terminated on 12 April 2016, citing the "economic landscape".

Al Jazeera UK
In 2014, Al Jazeera moved its UK London operations including its newsroom, studios and shows from Knightsbridge to its new space on floor 16 of The Shard. The last day of broadcasting from the Knightsbridge studios was September, 12th 2014. The space was officially opened on 3 November 2014, with the first Newshour broadcast on 10 October 2014. The new facility is capable of running an entire channel, independently of the Doha hub.

In 2013 Al Jazeera Media Network began planning a new channel called Al Jazeera UK. If launched, the British channel would broadcast for five hours during prime time as cut-in UK content aired on Al Jazeera English.

In 2006, producers and composers Yaniv Fridel and Chris Deliggianis were the main composers who wrote and produced the Al Jazeera English theme music five-note sonic logo for the channel branding including the main news program and channel package.

Programmes

In addition to those listed below, Al Jazeera English runs various programmes that are either entirely non-recurrent or consist of just a limited number of parts (miniseries format known as Special Series). All self-owned programmes, including former shows are shown in their entirety on Al Jazeera's website and YouTube. Licensed documentaries are available only on the website for a limited period of time, however. Currently running programmes on the channel are:

101 East – the weekly documentary strand for issues of particular importance across Asia and for people of Asian origins elsewhere. Presenters or hosts have included Teymoor Nabili and Fauziah Ibrahim
Al Jazeera Investigations – documentaries arising from the work of the Al Jazeera Investigative Unit. 
Counting the Cost – the weekly look at business and finance. Previously hosted by Kamahl Santamaria. 
Empire – a monthly programme exploring global powers and their policies. A discussion with host Marwan Bishara and his guests
Fault Lines – the documentary series focused on the forgotten and the unreported aspects of life in the United States. Presented by: Josh Rushing, Sebastian Walker, Wab Kinew and formerly by Zeina Awad.
Head To Head – A tough questioning interview programme presented by Mehdi Hasan. Mostly filmed at Oxford Union.
Inside Story – the daily investigation and analysis of a topical issue, with the aid of three guests from within and outside of the country in question. Jane Dutton and Shiulie Ghosh are regular hosts, but most of the Doha-based news-presenters have also taken the chair, including: Dareen Abughaida, Stephen Cole, Adrian Finighan, David Foster, Divya Gopalan, Veronica Pedrosa, Kamahl Santamaria, Folly Bah Thibault.
The Listening Post – analysis of how the other news organizations are covering the stories of the week, plus examination of viewer-submitted news. Created, showrun, and presented from London by Richard Gizbert.
My Zimbabwe - series about people living in the country such as Elias Libombo and writer Petina Gappah.
News:
 World news live from Al Jazeera's Doha broadcast centre
 World news live from Al Jazeera's London broadcast centre
 Newshour – an hour of world news and sport hosted from both of Al Jazeera's broadcast centres.
Newsgrid − an interactive news and live post. Launched on 14 November 2016 as part Of Al Jazeera English's 10 Year Anniversary of broadcast. Also airs on Facebook Live, aljazeera.com and the channel's YouTube Channel.
People & Power – a biweekly programme, originally presented by Dr. Shereen El Feki.
TechKnow – weekly show showcasing bright spots and innovations in the world of science and technology in the United States and how they are changing lives. Segments are recorded in the field by a group of young, tech-savvy contributors with diverse backgrounds in science and technology. 
The Bottom Line - a weekly discussion show moderated by Steven Clemons Steve Clemons at the Al Jazeera's studios in Washington, DC. With different guests each week, the show delves into "the big issues" facing American society. 
The Stream – a discussion programme focused on social media, daily from Monday to Thursday. Hosted by Femi Oke and Malika Bilal, usually with one guest in the studio and a couple on Skype. An issue, itself often viewer-generated, is discussed by the team and viewers can contribute with comments on Twitter or Facebook, with some occasionally invited to join in on Skype.
Talk to Al Jazeera  – extended studio interviews with people of influence from around the world:
Prime Minister Yingluck Shinawatra of Thailand talked to: Veronica Pedrosa
Viewfinder – Fresh perspectives through the lens of local filmmakers from around the globe. 
Witness – the daily-turned-weekly documentary-slot for films by the best of the world's independent film-makers. The strand aims to shine a light on the events and people long-forgotten by the global media and on those that never merited a mention in the first place.
UpFront – hosted by Marc Lamont Hill, discussion, debate and analysis programme from Washington, D.C.
AJ Go : Digital Series- To have their grip on changing landscape of media and journalism Al Jazeera has introduced a bunch of mini series on social media platform. It basically focuses on analysis of social trends happening in different parts of world. They offer a humane view of seeing things rather than some hardcore political and dogmatized perspective. The objective is to extract some meaningful insight from raw stories taking place everyday which the mainstream media would have ignored otherwise. They include programmes like- Start Here, Close Up, Fork The System, All Hail, Media Theorised, NewsFeed, Between Us, Project Force, Fly On The Wall, We Need To Talk etc.

Former programmes
These include programmes that have not had a new episode announced since 2014.
48 – weekly show hosted by Teymoor Nabili; Asian politics, business and current affairs
Everywoman – hosted by Shiulie Ghosh
Inside Iraq – coverage of the Iraq War, hosted by Jasim Al-Azzawi
Riz Khan – daily (Mon-Thu) viewer participation show, hosted by Riz Khan. Similar to CNN's Larry King Live
Riz Khan One on One – Riz Khan sits down with a single guest for an extended interview
Africa Investigates – African journalists risk their lives in order to reveal the truth about corruption and abuse across the continent
Sportsworld – a daily sports programme hosted on rotation by members of Al Jazeera's sports team
The Café – a discussion programme, hosted by Mehdi Hasan.
 Inside Story America – version of Inside Story focused on the United States.
The Fabulous Picture Show – hosted by Amanda Palmer, offers some interviews and reports on movies, actors and directors.
The Frost Interview (previously Frost Over The World) – this was hosted by David Frost. Frost died in 2013, and show still aired posthumously with the family's consent.

International bureaux
In addition to its two main broadcast centres, Al Jazeera English itself has 21 bureaux around the world that gather and produce news. It also shares resources with its Arabic-language sister channel's 42 bureaux, Al Jazeera Balkan's bureaux and Al Jazeera Turk's bureaux for 70 bureaux. This is a significant difference from the present trend:

	

Al Jazeera presenter may also alternate between broadcast centres. All channels also share English-speaking correspondents with Al Jazeera Arabic, Al Jazeera Turk and Al Jazeera Balkans and vice versa.

Middle East and the Maghreb

Broadcast Centre: Doha: Al Jazeera English Headquarters
Anchors: Dareen Abughaida, Richelle Carey, Jane Dutton, Adrian Finighan, Martine Dennis, Darren Jordon, Laura Kyle, Raheela Mahomed, Rob Matheson, Sohail Rahman, Folly Bah Thibault
Sports Desk: Andy Richardson
 
Weather Team: Richard Angwin, Everton Fox, Steff Gaulter
 
Correspondents & Reporters: Stan Grant (Principal Presenter); Hoda Abdel-Hamid, Zeina Khodr (Lebanon), Imran Khan (Palestine), Jamal Elshayyal, Clayton Swisher
 
Countries and Bureaux:

Sub-Saharan Africa
Correspondents:
West Africa: Nicolas Haque (Senegal); Ahmed Idris & Yvonne Ndege (Nigeria);
East Africa: Catherine (Wambua-)Soi;
Southern Africa: Haru Mutasa; Tanya Paige;

Countries and Bureaux:

Europe

Broadcast Centre: London: The Shard
Anchors: Felicity Barr, Julie MacDonald, Maryam Nemazee, Barbara Serra, Lauren Taylor 
Programme presenter: Richard Gizbert

Correspondents & Reporters:  Neave Barker, Natacha Butler (Paris), Paul Brennan, Rory Challands (Moscow), David Chater, Dominic Kane (Berlin), Robin Forestier-Walker (former CIS), Sonia Gallego, Emma Hayward, Laurence Lee (UK), Barnaby Phillips, John Psaropoulos (Greece), Jacky Rowland	

Countries and Bureaux:

Americas
Broadcast Centre: Washington, D.C.: 1200 New Hampshire Avenue, NW
Programme Hosts: Femi Oke & Malika Bilal; Marc Lamont Hill; and Josh Rushing, Sebastian Walker & Wab Kinew
 
Correspondents & Reporters: 
North America: James Bays, Gabriel Elizondo, Alan Fisher, Kimberly Halkett, Daniel Lak, Shihab Rattansi, Rob Reynolds, Kristen Saloomey, Casey Kauffman
South America: Lucia Newman
 
Countries and Bureaux

 Chicago, Illinois
 New York City, New York
 Los Angeles, California
 Miami, Florida
 San Francisco, California
 Toronto, Ontario, Canada
 Mexico City, Mexico
 Caracas, Venezuela
 São Paulo, Brazil
 Buenos Aires, Argentina

Indo-Pacific
Correspondents & Reporters: Jamela Alindogan (Philippines), Katrina Yu (China), Steve Chao, Rob McBride (Korea & Japan), Jennifer Glasse (Afghanistan), Divya Gopalan (Hong Kong), Wayne Hay, Kamal Hyder (Pakistan), Florence Looi (Malaysia), Jessica Washington (Indonesia), Shamim Chowdhury

Countries and Bureaux:

 Kuala Lumpur, Malaysia (AJMN Asia-Pacific headquarters)
 Kabul, Afghanistan
 Islamabad, Pakistan
 New Delhi, India
 Kathmandu, Nepal
 Dhaka, Bangladesh
 Colombo, Sri Lanka
 Beijing, China
 Seoul, South Korea
 Tokyo, Japan
 Naypyidaw, Myanmar
 Bangkok, Thailand
 Jakarta, Indonesia
 Manila, Philippines
 Ho Chi Minh City, Vietnam
 Sydney, Australia
 Wellington, New Zealand
 Hong Kong

Staff

Management
Managing director
 2004–2008 Nigel Parsons
 2008–2010: Tony Burman
 2010–2015: Al Anstey
2015–present: Giles Trendle

On-air staff
Al Jazeera English uses a combination of full-time 'staffers' and local freelancers. So long as the journalists are appearing – or are providing credited commentaries – regularly on-air, no distinction has been made as to their contractual arrangements. However, those who have received a recent on-air profile and whose names therefore appear in bold, may well be assumed to be on the staff.

Current
On-air staff currently working for the station (previous employer in brackets) include:

A
 Hoda Abdel-Hamid (ABC News, France 3) – correspondent: Arab states
 Dareen Abughaida (Dubai One, Bloomberg, CNBC) – presenter: Newshour: Doha
 Emily Angwin (CGTN, Seven News) – presenter: Newshour: Doha
 Richard Angwin (BBC, UK Met Office) – weather-presenter: Doha
B
 Neave Barker (RT) – correspondent: Europe
 Malika Bilal – co-host: The Stream
 Marwan Bishara (American University of Paris) – host: Empire
C
 David Chater (Kanal Pik) – correspondent: Europe
D
 Jane Dutton (CNN, CNBC, BBC) – news-presenter (Doha) & presenter: Inside Story & Inside Syria
E
 Jamal Elshayyal – correspondent: Doha, & presenter
 Farrah Esmail –  sports presenter: Doha

F
 Adrian Finighan (CNN) – presenter: Newshour: Doha
 Alan Fisher (GMTV) – correspondent: USA – Washington, DC
 Robin Forestier-Walker – presenter & correspondent: former-USSR states
 Everton Fox (BBC World) – weather-presenter: Doha
 Mohamed Fahmy – Cairo Bureau Chief: Egypt

G
 Richard Gizbert (ABC News) – creator, showrunner & presenter: The Listening Post: London
 Jennifer Glasse – correspondent: Afghanistan
 Divya Gopalan (BBC World, NBC, CNBC) – presenter: Newshour: Doha, & host (&: correspondent: Tajikistan)
 Peter Greste (BBC) – correspondent: Africa

H
 Kimberly Halkett (Global News) - correspondent: The White House
  Sana Hamouche – sports presenter: Doha
  Kamal Hyder - correspondent: Pakistan

 Marc Lamont Hill (CNN, Fox News, BET News) – host: UpFront

J
 Darren Jordon (BBC World) – presenter: Newshour: Doha
K
 Casey Kauffman – correspondent: USA
 Sara Khairat – correspondent & Social Media presenter on Newsgrid: Doha
 Zeina Khodr – correspondent: Lebanon

L
 Phil Lavelle  – correspondent: Europe & Near East
 Cara Legg (BBC) – weather-presenter: Doha
M
 Julie MacDonald (ITV, BBC World, GMTV) – presenter: Newshour: London
 Rob Matheson (BBC) – presenter: Newshour: Doha
 Haru Mutasa – correspondent: Africa, & host
 Mohamed Vall - Senior Correspondent MENA REGION
N 
 Gemma Nash – sports presenter: Doha
 Yvonne Ndege – correspondent: West Africa
 Maryam Nemazee – presenter: Newshour: London
 Lucia Newman (CNN) – presenter & correspondent: South America
O
 Femi Oke – co-host: The Stream
 Marga Ortigas (GMA News and Public Affairs, CNN) – correspondent: East Asia
P
 Verónica Pedrosa (ABS-CBN, BBC World, CNN International) – news-presenter (Doha) and correspondent: East Asia
 Barnaby Phillips (BBC) – correspondent: Europe
 Elizabeth Puranam – correspondent: India
R
 Rob Reynolds – correspondent: Bangladesh
 Andy Richardson (Sky News, ITN) – sports-presenter: Doha
 Josh Rushing (USMC) – presenter: Fault Lines, & host
S
 Maleen Saeed (BBC News, TRT World) – presenter: Newshour: Doha
 Barbara Serra (Sky News) – presenter: Newshour: London
 Andrew Simmons – correspondent: East Africa & Near East
 Clayton Swisher – presenter & correspondent: Doha – AJI Unit
T
 Nastasya Tay (SBS World News) – presenter: Newshour: Doha
 Lauren Taylor (ITN, Sky News) – presenter: Newshour: London (& Doha)
 Folly Bah Thibault (France 24) – presenter: Newshour: Doha
V
 Step Vaessen – correspondent: Indonesia
W
 Sebastian Walker – presenter: Fault Lines, & correspondent: Libya
 Jacob Ward – science correspondent
Z
 Sami Zeidan – (CNN, CNBC and NBC) – presenter: Newshour: Doha'Also: Shamim Chowdhury – producer & correspondent: Bangladesh Ghida Fakhry (Asharq Al-Awsat, Lebanese Broadcasting Corporation) – presenterStrands:101 East:People & Power: Sorious Samura – presenter Witness: - presenter
 Rageh Omaar - presenterAnd: Jane Arraf (Christian Science Monitor) – Baghdad
 Steve Gaisford (Sky News, ITV, Five)
 Dorothy Parvaz: Doha
 Phil Rees – correspondent (AJI Unit)
 Fred Weir (Christian Science Monitor) – Moscow

Al Jazeera Media Network correspondents also appearing on AJE: Dena Takruri – With AJ+

Key
AJI Unit – Al Jazeera Investigative Unit

Former presenters and correspondents
Those who have retired, died, left, or resigned from Al Jazeera Media Network completely.

 Jasim Al-Azzawi
 Laila Al Shaikhli
 Derrick Ashong
 Zeina Awad
 Felicity Barr 
 Richelle Carey 
 Melissa Chan
 Stephen Cole
 Brendan Connor
 Franc Contreras
 Martine Dennis
 Dr. Shereen El Feki
 Elizabeth Filippouli
 Lisa Fletcher – now at WJLA-TV in Washington, D.C.
 Sir David Frost (1939–2013)
 Imran Garda
 Steff Gaulter 
 Shiulie Ghosh 
 Tony Harris
 Mehdi Hasan – now at Peacock
 Fauziah Ibrahim
 Avi Lewis
 Hamish Macdonald
 Anita McNaught 
 Supa Mandiwanzira
 Dave Marash
 Halla Mohieddeen
 Ayman Mohyeldin
 Teymoor Nabili
 Anand Naidoo
 Arthur Neslen
 Rageh Omaar
 Shahnaz Pakravan
 Amanda Palmer
 Cal Perry
 Jacky Rowland 
 Shakuntala Santhiran 
 Mark Seddon
 Sherine Tadros
 Mónica VillamizarAl Jazeera America: Chris Bury
 Joie Chen
 Ash-har Quraishi
 Roxana Saberi
 Ray Suarez
 John Henry Smith
 Cara Santa Maria
 Raheela Mahomed

Recruitment

The late veteran British broadcaster David Frost joined Al Jazeera English in 2005 to host his show Frost Over the World.

Former BBC and CNN anchor Riz Khan, who previously had been the host of the CNN talk show Q&A, also joined. He hosts his shows Riz Khan and Riz Khan's One on One.

Former U.S. Marine Josh Rushing joined Al Jazeera in September 2005. He had been the press officer for the United States Central Command during the 2003 Invasion of Iraq, and in that role had been featured in the documentary Control Room. When subsequently joining Al Jazeera, Rushing commented that "In a time when American media has become so nationalized, I'm excited about joining an organization that truly wants to be a source of global information...." Rushing worked from the Washington DC broadcasting centre until the formation of Al Jazeera America, he now works from AJAM's San Francisco hub.

Former CNN and BBC news anchorwoman and award-winning journalist Veronica Pedrosa also joined the team, along with CNN producer James Wright, and Kieran Baker, a former editor and producer for CNN, who had been acting general manager, Communications and Public Participation for ICANN. On 2 December 2005, Stephen Cole, a senior anchor on BBC World and Click Online presenter, announced he was joining Al Jazeera International.

The network announced on 12 January 2006 that former Nightline correspondent Dave Marash would be the co-anchor from their Washington studio. Marash described his new position as "the most interesting job on Earth".
On 6 February 2006, it was announced that the former BBC reporter Rageh Omaar would host the weeknight documentary series, Witness.

The managing director for Al Jazeera English was previously Tony Burman, who replaced Nigel Parsons in May 2008. The current managing director is Al Anstey.

In mid 2014 Al Jazeera English froze employment of both permanent and freelance staff for its Qatar network and cut freelance pay rates by 30-40% without warning, while at the same time Al Jazeera lodged a $150 million claim for compensation against Egypt, arguing that by arresting and attacking Al Jazeera journalists, seizing the broadcaster's property and jamming its signal, the Egyptian government has violated its rights as a foreign investor in the country and put the $90 million it has invested in Egypt since 2001 at risk.

Al Jazeera Investigative Unit

Formed in 2010, in its own words: the role of Al Jazeera Investigations is not to report the news, but to make the news.

The Unit, is based at the Network headquarters in Doha, but also has representation in London and Washington, DC. The unit is an Al Jazeera Media Network asset and its reports appear equally on the other channels, tailored appropriately for the relevant language and audience. The documentaries are presented as specials under their own strand: Al Jazeera Investigates.

The Unit's investigations have included the documentary What Killed Arafat? which explains how Yasser Arafat died. This film won a CINE Golden Eagle Award and was nominated for a BAFTA. In 2013, Al Jazeera released a follow-up named "Killing Arafat" which revealed findings of scientific analysis of the exhumed remains of the Palestinian leader that discovered traces of polonium in his bones. The Arafat findings led news agendas globally.

Other major investigations have included:

 How to Sell a Massacre, in which concealed cameras record an Australian political party promising to soften anti-gun laws while seeking millions in political funding from America's gun lobby.
 Generation Hate, which exposes secret links between one of France's largest political parties and a movement calling for the expulsion of Muslims from Europe.
 Football's Wall of Silence, which investigates the deadly scandal of long-term sexual abuse of young players in British football.
 Broken Dreams: The Boeing 787 Dreamliner, which revealed that Boeing's workers feared to fly the plane they build, citing quality concerns and alleging drug use on the job.
 The Labour Files, a four-part series based on what it claimed to be the "largest leak of documents in British political history" which aims to show that "a coup by stealth" was conducted against then-Labour Party leader Jeremy Corbyn.

The current manager of Investigative Journalism for the Al Jazeera Media Network is Phil Rees. Before that, it was Clayton Swisher. Other leading figures include: Peter Charley, Will Thorne, Deborah Davies, Will Jordan, Simon Boazman, David Harrison, Kevin Hirten, James Kleinfeld and Jason Gwynne.

Availability
The channel is available in many countries, mostly via satellite, sometimes via cable. The channel is also available online. Al Jazeera English provides a free HD stream on its website for unlimited viewing. It is available free worldwide. They also provide a free stream on their YouTube page. Previously, before Al Jazeera provided an official stream, a low quality RealVideo stream was available for viewing. Al Jazeera news segments are frequently included on the American public television program Worldfocus. Al Jazeera can also be streamed on any iOS or Android device with an internet connection using a free application.

Al Jazeera English is also available on connected TV and OTT streaming services like Pluto TV and Haystack News.

Along with a free unlimited high-quality stream on the official Al Jazeera English website, Online subscriptions allowing unlimited viewing may be purchased from Jump TV, RealPlayer, and VDC. Headlines from Al Jazeera English are available on Twitter.

Al Jazeera English's website also contains news reports and full episodes of their programs that can be viewed for free on their website. The videos are hosted by YouTube, where viewers can also go to find the videos.Al Jazeera English  YouTube

Europe
Al Jazeera English is available in the UK and Ireland on Freeview channel 235, Sky channels 513 and 880, Freesat channel 203 and Virgin Media channel 622.

The channel initially began test streaming Al Jazeera English (then called "Al Jazeera International") in March 2006 on Hot Bird, Astra 1E, Hispasat, AsiaSat3S, Eutelsat 28A and Panamsat PAS 10. Telenors Thor, Türksat and Eutelsat 25A were added to the satellites carrying it. Eutelsat 28A carried the test stream on frequency 11.681 under the name "AJI".

Africa
Al Jazeera English is available in Sub Saharan Africa mainly via DStv and StarTimes' satellite and terrestrial TV platforms.
It is also available FTA on satellites like Belintersat 51.5°E and Nilesat 201.
In Northern Africa, Al Jazeera English is available on telcos like Etisalat. It is also available via satellite, on Badr°26E and various local cable operators.

Oceania
In New Zealand, Al Jazeera English is available 24 hours a day on Freeview (New Zealand) channel 16 and Sky (New Zealand) channel 90. From October 2013, Freeview (New Zealand) broadcast on the Kordia operated free-to-air DVB-T terrestrial network. Prior to the December 2012 analog switchoff Triangle TV re-broadcast various Al Jazeera programmes in Auckland on its free-to-air UHF channel. TV One was going to replace BBC World with this service during their off-air hours of 01:30 to 06:00 from 1 April 2013, however opted to run infomercials instead.

Asia
In April 2010, Al Jazeera English was taken off air in Singapore Singtel TV with unspecified reasons, according to the official Al Jazeera English website.

On 7 December 2010, Al Jazeera said its English language service has got a downlink license to broadcast in India. Satellite and cable companies would therefore be allowed to broadcast Al Jazeera in the country. The channel launched on Dish TV in November 2011, and is considering a Hindi-language channel. Tata Play satellite service broadcasts this on Channel 637 (SD) in India.

Americas
On 26 November 2009, the Canadian Radio-television and Telecommunications Commission approved "a request to add Al Jazeera English (AJE) to the lists of eligible satellite services for distribution on a digital basis and amends the lists of eligible satellite services accordingly". Al Jazeera English became available on Rogers Cable, Videotron and Bell Satellite TV on 4 May 2010.

Al Jazeera English is available via satellite across all of North America free to air via Globecast on Galaxy 19 on the Ku band in DVB format. As of 2011, only a small number of Americans were able to watch the channel on their televisions. Among the markets where it was available were Bristol County, Rhode Island, Toledo and Sandusky, Ohio, Burlington, Vermont, Houston, Texas, and Washington, DC. Industry giant Comcast originally planned to carry Al Jazeera English in 2007, but reversed its decision shortly before the channel's launch, citing "the already-saturated television market". The two major American satellite providers, DirecTV and Dish Network, had similar plans but also changed their minds, with speculation that the decision may have been influenced by allegations by the Bush administration of "anti-American bias" in the channel.

With Al Jazeera's coverage of the Egyptian Revolution of 2011, the channel drew acclaim and received renewed attention. The New York Times reported on 1 February 2011 that 1.6 million U.S. viewers had tuned in via Internet stream, and stated that new discussions were underway with carriers. The following month, it was announced that Al Jazeera entered carriage negotiations with Comcast and Time Warner Cable. Salon.com described the channel's English-language coverage as "mandatory viewing for anyone interested in the world-changing events currently happening in Egypt", while Huffington Post contributor Jeff Jarvis claimed it was "un-American" for operators to not carry the network. When Al Jazeera covered the Libyan Civil War, U.S. Secretary of State Hillary Clinton noted an increasing American audience for the network, saying that "viewership of Al Jazeera is going up in the United States because it's real news. You may not agree with it, but you feel like you're getting real news around the clock instead of a million commercials and—you know—arguments between talking heads and the kind of stuff that we do on our news which—you know—is not particularly informative to us, let alone foreigners."

On 1 February 2011, Internet appliance Roku posted on its Facebook page that the English-language Al Jazeera Live would be streaming on Roku devices through a private channel called Newscaster and also through the BBC channel. It permitted the announcement following unrest in Egypt so American viewers can watch the latest events going on in the Middle East. A Roku user must add the private channel Newscaster from the Roku website.

On 1 August 2011, Al Jazeera English began airing 23 hours a day in New York City as part of a sublet agreement with cable channel RISE, a former Spanish-language network, which is carried on WRNN-TV's DT2 subchannel (the other hours were used to meet FCC E/I and local programming guidelines). The network aired on Time Warner Cable on channel 92 and on Verizon FiOS on channel 481.

On 2 January 2013, Al Jazeera announced that it had acquired the U.S.-based cable TV channel Current TV for a reported $500 million. With this acquisition, Al Jazeera launched a new channel, called Al Jazeera America, with a heavy dose of U.S. domestic news along with Al Jazeera English programming and news, to an estimated 40 million U.S. households—putting it in direct competition with CNN, MSNBC and Fox News Channel.

Due to contracts with U.S. cable and satellite carriers for Al Jazeera America the official Al Jazeera English live stream was geo-blocked in the United States on 18 August 2013. With the launch of Al Jazeera America, Al Jazeera English was excluded from all US services carrying or providing the channel, including YouTube, with Al Jazeera America material replacing all Al Jazeera English video content and live streams. Most Al Jazeera English video content was no longer officially available in the United States.

In April 2014 the Al Jazeera English show Empire wasn't geo-blocked in the United States. Shortly after the programs Indian Hospital, Viewfinder, Lifelines: The Quest for Global Health and Head to Head were available also. These programs were the only AJE shows officially non-geoblocked for American viewing during the time that Al Jazeera America was in existence.

With the closure of Al Jazeera America in April 2016 it was expected that the official live stream of Al Jazeera English and access to its programmes would eventually be restored to the United States. The online live stream of Al Jazeera English was made available to viewers in the United States once again in September 2016.

Controversies

Al Jazeera English journalists Egyptian detainment

 
In December 2013, three Al Jazeera English journalists (Peter Greste, Mohamed Fahmy and Baher Mohamed) were arrested in their Cairo Marriott hotel rooms and detained on charges of delivering "false news" and "aiding a terrorist organization" in Egypt following the 2013 Egyptian coup d'état. Al Jazeera was one of several websites to which the Egyptian government blocked access after accusing the network of ties to the Muslim Brotherhood, which was removed from power during the 2013 coup. Egypt has been accused of limiting freedom of expression in an attempt to suppress opposition to President Abdel Fattah el-Sisi.
 		 	
Al Jazeera, BBC and other news organizations launched the Twitter and social media campaign #FreeAJStaff. Calls from the United Nations, European Union and the United States for the journalists' release were ignored.

Greste, Fahmy and Mohamed had trials adjourned more than ten times. Questionable evidence included video from other news organizations claiming to be from Al Jazeera English, inaudible audio recordings, pictures from a family vacation, a music video and video of sheep.
 
On 23 June 2014, the journalists were found guilty. Greste and Fahmy were sentenced to seven years in prison, while Mohamed was sentenced to 10 years. The ruling was denounced by fellow journalists, including some at BBC, CNN and ABC News Australia. World leaders from Australia, Canada, United States, United Nations, Switzerland and the United Kingdom deemed the trials politically motivated and called the ruling an attack on freedom of the press. United States Secretary of State John Kerry had been assured of press freedom in Egypt by al-Sisi a day earlier.

Calls for amnesty, clemency and pardons by various governments and news agencies were ignored by the Egyptian government, who said their justice system was independent. There were also calls for the United States to end or suspend funding for the Egyptian military in response to the case.

Greste was released from prison and deported to Australia on 1 February 2015.
 
On 29 August 2015, Fahmy, Greste and Mohamed were sentenced to three years in prison in a decision heavily criticized internationally. The Government of Canada worked to have Fahmy pardoned and deported. On 23 September 2015, Fahmy and Mohamed were pardoned by el-Sisi, along with 100 other people, and released from prison.

Expulsion from China
Al Jazeera English's longtime China correspondent Melissa Chan was expelled from the country in 2012. The Chinese government did not provide any public reasons but was known to have been unhappy over a documentary the channel had aired on China's prison system. On 8 May 2012, reporters from the Beijing press corps asked about the expulsion at the Chinese Foreign Ministry's daily press briefing. Officials did not provide an explanation, and deleted most of the questions when they published their official transcript. Chan later worked at Al Jazeera America.

Criticism

As with Al Jazeera's Arabic counterpart, the network has received criticism from having bias from several sides.

 Allegations of anti-American bias 
Emmy award-winning journalist Dave Marash, who served as a veteran correspondent for ABC's Nightline, resigned from his position as Washington anchor for Al Jazeera English in 2008. Marash cited "reflexive adversarial editorial stance" against Americans and "anti-American bias"."Anchor Quits Al Jazeera, Cites Anti-American Tone"  Ynetnews, 28 March 2008

According to the media scholar Marwan M. Kraidy, when launching the English network, Al Jazeera framed the new channel as a competitor to BBC and CNN, but with coverage oriented towards the Global South.

It is often unclear whether recent discussions of anti-American bias at Al Jazeera are referring also to Al Jazeera English or only to Al Jazeera's Arabic-language channel. There are significant differences in tone between the English and Arabic-language channels. (According to bilingual Palestinian journalist Daoud Kuttab, "The English channel uses more neutral terminology; the Arab channel is much harsher.") An example of this is a 2011 claim by Bill O'Reilly that Al Jazeera is "anti-Semitic" and "anti-American" and a subsequent defense of Al Jazeera against these claims made by former Al Jazeera English anchor Dave Marash on the O'Reilly Factor. However report by United Press International in December 2002, stated about the network being unbiased and not anti-American. Stonehill College Professor Mohammed el-Nawawy added in his interview that "Al Jazeera, the Free Arab News Network Scooped the World and Changed the Middle East, people should know that Al Jazeera has really revolutionized the media scene in the Arab world," he told United Press International. el-Nawawy also added “to think of Al Jazeera as a pro-Taliban, or even pro al Qaida outlet is "absolutely wrong,".

Another example concerns statements by former US Secretary of Defense Donald Rumsfeld, who in April 2004 denounced Al-Jazeera's Arabic-language coverage of the Iraq War as "vicious, inaccurate and inexcusable", but took a more conciliatory tone in a 2011 interview for Frost Over The World, Al Jazeera English's news and public affairs program hosted by David Frost, praising the network as "an important means of communication in the world". The government of which Rumsfeld was part had deliberately targeted Al Jazeera journalists in Iraq and Afghanistan, and discussed bombing its headquarters in Doha.

On 12 October 2008, Al Jazeera English broadcast interviews with people attending a Sarah Palin United States presidential election rally in St. Clairsville, Ohio, with interviewees making comments about Barack Obama such as "he regards white people as trash" and "I'm afraid if he wins, the blacks will take over"...The report received over two million views on YouTube. Following this, The Washington Post ran an op-ed, claiming the news channel was deliberately encouraging "anti-American sentiment overseas", which was criticized by Al Jazeera as "a gratuitous and uninformed shot at Al Jazeera's motives", as the report was just one of "hundreds of hours of diverse coverage". Criticism of an Anti-American bias has been dwindling as their coverage of the Arab Spring received wide acclaim and calls for the network to be added to U.S. television.

Subsequent endeavours have been seen as tests by Al Jazeera to see whether it can get rid of the hostility Americans feel toward it. One example was a day's worth of special coverage marking the 10th anniversary of the terrorist attacks of 11 September 2001. Al Jazeera has also launched The Stream, a show based in Washington D.C. that discusses social media, which targets an American audience. On 2 January 2013, Al Jazeera purchased the American channel Current TV and rebranded as Al Jazeera America in August 2013.

On 13 January 2016, Al Jazeera America announced that the network would be terminated on 12 April 2016, citing the "economic landscape".

Awards

As of May 2017, Al Jazeera English has won more than 150 prizes, medals and awards.

See also

Competitors

Al Mayadeen
BBC World News
CNN International
Deutsche Welle
France 24
i24NEWS
NHK World
Press TV
RT
TRT World

References

Further reading
 Philip Seib (ed.): Al Jazeera English. Global News in a Changing World. Palgrave Macmillan, April 2012, 
Josh Rushing: Mission Al-Jazeera: Build a Bridge, Seek the Truth, Change the World. Palgrave Macmillan, 2007
Tine Ustad Figenschou: Al Jazeera and the Global Media Landscape: The South is Talking Back''. Routledge, 2013

External links
 
 Official Al Jazeera
 Al Jazeera English channel on YouTube
 Al Jazeera English on satellite broadcast around the world
 
 

24-hour television news channels
Al Jazeera
English-language television stations
International broadcasters
Foreign television channels broadcasting in the United Kingdom
Television channels in the Netherlands
Television channels in Belgium
Television channels in Flanders
High-definition television
Qatari brands
2006 establishments in Qatar
2006 establishments in the United Kingdom
Television channels and stations established in 2006
Publicly funded broadcasters

it:Al Jazeera#Al Jazeera English